The qualification for the 1984 European Competition for Women's Football was held between August 18, 1982, and October 28, 1983.

Teams were placed into four groups of four teams each according to geographical location — Group 1 was Northern Europe, Group 2 was Great Britain and Ireland, Group 3 was Southern Europe, Group 4 was Central Europe.

Each team played each other team in its group twice, home and away, earning two points for a win and one for a draw. The first-placed teams qualified.

Results

Group 1 (North)

Sweden qualified for the final tournament.

Group 2 (Great Britain and Ireland)

England qualified for the final tournament.

Group 3 (South)

Italy qualified for the final tournament.

Group 4 (Central)

Denmark qualified for the final tournament.

References

External links
1982–84 UEFA Women's EURO at UEFA.com
Tables & results at RSSSF.com

UEFA Women's Championship qualification
UEFA
UEFA
1982 in European sport
1983 in European sport
Qualification